Chad Webber (born June, 1960) is an American graphic designer and former child actor noted for providing the voice of Charlie Brown in various Peanuts animation films during the early 1970s.

Filmography

As production designer
The Indian Detective (2017) - Graphic playback
Blood Drive (2017–present) - On set graphics
Maze Runner: The Death Cure (2018) (post-production) - Graphic playback
Tremors 6 (2018) - Graphic playback

As actor
Snoopy Come Home (film musical - 1972) - Charlie Brown (voice)
You're Not Elected, Charlie Brown (TV Special 1972) - Charlie Brown (voice)
There's No Time for Love, Charlie Brown (TV Special 1973) - Charlie Brown (voice)
Under the Boardwalk: The Monopoly Story (2010) - Charlie Brown (archive footage; voice)

External links
 

American male child actors
American child singers
Living people
1960 births